A soku is a traditional West African instrument used in a type of music called Wassoulou which originated in the Wasulu region of southwest Mali. It is a traditional fiddle, sometimes replaced by modernized versions of the instrument.  Known as the n'diaraka or njarka in Songhai, and goje in Hausa, it is composed of a single string that usually wails the feminine vocal melody.

References

Bowed instruments
Malian musical instruments